The County of Villiers is one of the 37 counties of Victoria which are part of the cadastral divisions of Australia, used for land titles. It includes the area to the north of Warrnambool, and to the west of the Hopkins River. The county was proclaimed in 1849.

Parishes 
Parishes include:
 Adzar, Victoria
 Ballangeich, Victoria
 Banangal, Victoria
 Port Fairy, Victoria
 Bilpah, Victoria
 Boonahwah, Victoria
 Boorpool, Victoria
 Bootahpool, Victoria
 Boramboram, Victoria
 Broadwater, Victoria
 Buckeran Yarrack, Victoria
 Bullanbul, Victoria
 Caramut, Victoria
 Caramut South, Victoria
 Chatsworth West, Victoria
 Clonleigh, Victoria
 Codrington, Victoria
 Cooramook, Victoria
 Corea, Victoria
 Croxton East, Victoria
 Dunkeld, Victoria
 Framlingham West, Victoria
 Hexham West, Victoria
 Jennawarra, Victoria
 Kangertong, Victoria
 Kapong, Victoria
 Kay, Victoria
 Koroit, Victoria
 Langulac, Victoria
 Linlithgow, Victoria
 Meerai, Victoria
 Minhamite, Victoria
 Minjah, Victoria
 Minjah North, Victoria
 Nanapundah, Victoria
 Nareeb Nareeb, Victoria
 Pom Pom, Victoria
 Purdeet, Victoria
 Purdeet East, Victoria
 Purnim, Victoria
 Quamby, Victoria
 Quamby North, Victoria
 St. Helens, Victoria
 Tallangoork, Victoria
 Wangoom, Victoria
 Warrong, Victoria
 Willatook, Victoria
 Woolsthorpe, Victoria
 Yalimba, Victoria
 Yalimba East, Victoria
 Yambuk, Victoria
 Yangery, Victoria
 Yarpturk, Victoria
 Yatchew East, Victoria
 Yatmerone, Victoria
 Yeth-youang, Victoria
 Yuppeckiar, Victoria

References
Research Aids, Victoria 1910
Map of the County of Villiers, 1886, National Library of Australia
Vicnames, Villiers county

Counties of Victoria (Australia)
Barwon South West (region)